The following is the final results of the Iranian Volleyball Super League (Velayat Cup) 1999/2000 season.

Standings

References 
 volleyball.ir
 Parssport

League 1999-00
Iran Super League, 1999-00
Iran Super League, 1999-00
Volleyball League, 1999-00
Volleyball League, 1999-00